Pseudocraterellus undulatus is a species of fungus belonging to the family Hydnaceae. It has the common name sinuous chanterelle.

Synonym:
 Merulius undulatus Pers., 1801 (basionym)
 Pseudocraterellus sinuosus (Fr.) Corner, 1958

Description 
Pseudocraterellus undulatus is a small funnel shaped mushroom with tough grey flesh.

Cap: 1-5cm. Starts as convex or depressed but quickly becomes funnel shaped/infundibuliform with irregular edges and wrinkles. Hymenium is wrinkled and branching, greyish-brown in colour with distant spacing and decurrent attachment. Stem: 3-6cm. Tapers downwards and is often grooved and twisted with adjacent mushrooms fusing together above the base. Spore print: White to pale yellow. Spores: Broadly ellipsoid, smooth, non-amyloid. 9.5-12 x 7-8 μm. Taste: Mild. Smell: Faint and indefinite.

Habitat and distribution 
Grows on soil and amongst leaf litter in broad-leaved woods. It is a mycorrhizal species which is especially associated with beech, hazel and oak trees. Can grow as a solitary mushroom or in small groups which may be attached to one another. It is widespread but only occasionally found and may grow from Summer to Autumn.

Edibility 
Whilst P. undulatus is regarded as an edible mushroom with a mild taste it may grow too rarely to justify picking.

References

Hydnaceae
Taxa named by Christiaan Hendrik Persoon
Fungi described in 1801